Sakanshah (Middle Persian: Sagān-šāh, "king of the Saka") was the title used by the rulers (and later governors) of Sakastan, first appearing during Surenid rule. The title was also used by the governors of Sakastan and Turgistan during the Sasanian era. However, during the early reign of king Peroz I (r. 459–484), the title was abolished.

References

Sources 
 

 
 

Iranian words and phrases
Sasanian administrative offices
History of Sistan and Baluchestan Province
Parthian titles and offices
Royal titles